Sagakkal is a 2011 Indian Tamil language romantic drama film directed by L. Muthukumaraswamy. The film stars Sanjeev and Advaitha, with Shankar, Enamala Shiva Shankar, Jayaprakash, Vennira Aadai Moorthy, Senthi Kumari, Sujatha Panju, M. Bhanumathi, and Pon Radha playing supporting roles. The film, produced by V. V. V. Creations, had musical score by Thayarathnam and was released on 12 August 2011.

Plot
In a remote village, Mahi is an ambitious football player who aspires to work for Indian Railways on sports quota, and he lives with his widowed mother. His best friends Meiyyar and Balu often tease Mahi for being single, while Mahi hates people who are in love. One day, Mahi falls in love with Devasena at first sight. Devasena is from a wealthy and respected family. Mahi starts to tell lies about his love matter to his friends. Later, Mahi and his friends go on a pilgrimage to Palani Murugan temple, and Devasena is also part of the pilgrimage, but Mahi is unable to convey his love. When Devasena learns of Mahi loving her and lying about their love to his friends, she scolds him. Mahi, in turn, tells Devasena that his love is pure and sincerely loves her. One day, Devasena's father Varadhan is stabbed by his relative, and Mahi takes him to the hospital, thus saving his life. Devasena thanks him for saving her father. Devasena, who slowly fell in love with Mahi, agrees to marry him but only with the approval of her family. Meanwhile, Varadhan finds her a groom. Mahi and Devasena decide to elope and to get married with the help of Meiyyar and Balu. Devasena then feels bad not telling anything to her father, so she calls him and convinces him to unite them. Unfortunately, Devasena meets with an accident and dies at the hospital. Her family scolds Mahi, and a heartbroken Mahi dies on the spot.

Cast

Sanjeev as Mahi
Advaitha as Devasena
Shankar as Meiyyar
Enamala Shiva Shankar as Balu
Jayaprakash as Varadhan
Vennira Aadai Moorthy
Senthi Kumari as Mahi's mother
Sujatha Panju as Devasena's mother
M. Bhanumathi as Devasena's grandmother
Pon Radha as Pon
Neepa as Gayathri
Vengal Rao as Devotee
L. Muthukumaraswamy as Varadhan's relative
Hello Kandasamy as Bathroom Owner
Pattiveeranpatti Meenakshi

Production
L. Muthukumaraswamy, who worked as an assistant director for Thirumurugan, made his directorial debut with Sagakkal under the banner of V. V. V. Creations. Sanjeev was cast to play the hero while Advaitha was chosen to play the role of the love interest. The music was composed by Thayarathnam, the cinematography was by Sri M. Azhagappan and the dialogues were by Bhaskar Sakthi.

Soundtrack

The film score and the soundtrack were composed by Thayarathnam. The soundtrack, released in 2011, features 6 tracks with lyrics written by Yugabharathi and Thayarathnam.

Release
The film was released on 12 August 2011 alongside five other films.

Behindwoods.com rated the film 0.5 out of 5 and said, "The movie has an amateurish look and feel. Cinematography is a letdown and songs are just about okay. Director Muthukumarasamy must tune his direction to suit to the sensibilities of the target audience. Otherwise, his product will be stuck in the middle for want of audience".

References

2011 films
2010s Tamil-language films
Indian romantic drama films
2011 directorial debut films
2011 romantic drama films